Manor Independent School District (MISD) is a public school district based in Manor, Texas (USA). The district serves much of Manor, as well as a wide section of northeastern Austin and a small portion of Pflugerville. In 2022, the school district received a C rating from the Texas Education Agency.

Samsung Austin Semiconductor and Applied Materials Austin, located in Austin, Texas and in the Manor Independent School District, have developed strong partnerships with Manor ISD, with increased support of STEM initiatives and building an effective mentoring program.

In May 2013, former President Barack Obama visited Manor New Tech High School as part of his jobs and opportunity tour. Manor New Tech High School specializes in Science, Technology Engineering, and Math (STEM).

Schools

High schools (grades 9-12)
Manor High School
Manor New Technology High School
Manor Excel Academy
Manor Senior High School
Manor Early College High School

Middle schools (grades 6-8)
Decker Middle School
Manor Middle School
Manor New Technology Middle School

Elementary schools (grades PK-5)
Blake Manor Elementary
Bluebonnet Trail Elementary
Decker Elementary
Manor Elementary
Oak Meadows Elementary
Pioneer Crossing Elementary
Presidential Meadows Elementary
Shadowglen Elementary
Lagos Elementary

References

External links

Manor ISD
 Manor New Technology High School

School districts in Travis County, Texas
Education in Austin, Texas
School districts established in 1885
1885 establishments in Texas